Sardar Aurang Zeb Khan was a Pakistani politician from the Khyber-Pakhtunkhwa province of Pakistan. He served of the Chief Minister of the province from 25 May 1943 to 16 March 1945.

External links 
 Khyber Pakhtunkhwa Provincial Government

References

Chief Ministers of Khyber Pakhtunkhwa